Reginald Ernest Arundel "Reg" Parker (10 June 1921 – 1997) was a Welsh professional footballer.

Career
A centre-forward, Parker began his career at Cardiff City, playing for the side in wartime fixtures. Parker later went on to serve in World War II before returning to Ninian Park on his return, where he was unable to force his way past Stan Richards and made just two appearances at the end of the 1947–48 season.

In August 1948, he joined Newport County in exchange for Bryn Allen, going on to make 201 appearances for the side between 1948 and 1954, scoring 99 goals.

References

1921 births
1997 deaths
Association football forwards
British Army personnel of World War II
Cardiff City F.C. players
Date of death missing
Newport County A.F.C. players
People from Llantrisant
Sportspeople from Rhondda Cynon Taf
English Football League players
Welsh footballers